Isma Alif Bin Mohd Salim (born 22 February 1987) is a Malaysian footballer who plays for Ultimate. His preferred position is as a right back and midfielder, and specially as a right back.

Career
Isma Alif started his professional career in Perak youth squad. Starting from the 2009 season, he was one of several Perak youth players promoted to main squad after the exodus of Perak players to other teams. He was released from his contract with Perak at the end of the 2012 season.

He joined PBDKT T-Team FC for the 2013 season.

References

External links
 Isma Alif profile at Opera Sports
 Isma Alif profile at Seladang.net

1987 births
Living people
Malaysian footballers
Perak F.C. players
People from Perak
Malaysian people of Malay descent
Melaka United F.C. players
Association football midfielders
Association football fullbacks